is a Japanese manga series written and illustrated by Jun Mochizuki. It has been serialized in Square Enix's shōnen manga magazine Monthly Gangan Joker since December 2015. In North America, the manga is published in English by Yen Press.

The Case Study of Vanitas is set in a fictional 19th-century Paris and contains vampire and steampunk thematics. The story focuses on the young Vanitas and the vampire Noé Archiviste in Vanitas's quest to heal cursed vampires through his grimoire called The Book of Vanitas. Mochizuki was heavily inspired to write Vanitas following her first visit to France as well as by vampire films. She aimed to surpass her previous work, Pandora Hearts, by drawing more appealing fight scenes and focusing more on the themes involving hidden identities. An anime television series adaptation produced by Bones aired from July 2021 to April 2022.

As of June 2021, The Case Study of Vanitas had over 5.5 million copies in circulation. The manga has been praised for the handling of its two main characters and the use of action sequences combined with effective comedy. The anime adaptation enjoyed a similar reception for its visuals and fantasy elements.

Plot

During an airship ride to Paris, the vampire Noé Archiviste meets Vanitas, a human claiming to be a vampire's doctor curing them of the malnomen, which causes vampires to behave predatorily against their will. The book with which he heals, The Book of Vanitas, is connected to the original Vanitas, the Vampire of the Blue Moon, hated by the Vampires of the Red Moon who form the traditional vampire society. Noé and Vanitas join forces to heal vampires, but there lurks a threat of some unknown force named Charlatan, which may be responsible for corrupting the sick vampires.

Production

For her next work after the manga Pandora Hearts, Jun Mochizuki wanted to draw vampires in a high school setting. Vanitas was the first character she created during a trip to France. While sightseeing in Mont Saint-Michel, she mused about drawing the story of a single vampire who had watched over an island for about a hundred years. Everything else about The Case Study of Vanitas came from that one idea, and the general forms of Vanitas and Noé were then concluded. There were multiple things she thought about doing after Pandora Hearts, like increasing the number of romance and battle elements. The head editor told her to cut down on them since she was not skilled at them. She started to draw more, believing they would be more appealing the more she practiced. The usage of a steampunk setting was done because the author has been a fan of it for a long time and to contrast with her previous work.

One of her influences to draw a vampire story was the 1994 movie Interview with the Vampire, which was based on the novel by Anne Rice. When she watched it, she was captivated by the tragic and fleeting existence of vampires, as well as the blood-sucking scenes, so those ideas were planted firmly in the author's mind. Additionally, it had an effect on her fondness for stories with a dynamic between a young man and a girl, which influenced her handling of the protagonists. Paris was the first place she ever visited outside of Japan, which highly impressed her. She had been invited as a guest to Japan Expo, which influenced Noé's fondness for the city. This eventually led to her decision to set the manga in France. The Paladins of the Catholic Church draw their motif from the legend of Charlemagne. The characters from Vanitas are not actually the same people as those in the legend, but she liked to play around with the shared relationship dynamics and character traits. Mochizuki claims the genre of vampire stories has already been used several times, and she had to find something to differentiate herself from the many vampiric works that already exist. By studying the myth and the figure of vampires, she realized that these creatures have several weak points, and that it could be interesting to exploit that in order to give a new point of view.

Initially, Vanitas was the vampire, and Noé was the human. Drawing inspiration from Sherlock Holmes, Vanitas took the role of Holmes and Noé of Dr. Watson. Despite the author's attempts, the boss criticised her generic concept. She agreed when providing consultation. She was eventually suggested to switch the protagonists' roles, which she found more striking. A different friend of her criticized her design for Vanitas, which is how he ended up developing the two-level side bangs. Noé's design completely changed from the first drafts to his final form. Originally he had glasses and was more of the straight man of the comedy duo, but she was forced to abandon those and other ideas. Due to the lead's clashing natures, Mochizuki wrote them to avoid turning them into friends. She does not had any specific points of fixation when it comes to expressions, but she usually ended up redrawing the expression several times when making a new panel. Rather than writing villains, Mochizuki wanted to make all her characters relatable. She also aimed to improve multiple of her flaws in regard to Pandora Hearts, such as the inclusion of meaningless deaths.

Adaptation
For the anime adaptation of the series done by Bones, producer Naoki Amano was behind every aspect of the production process. In the script-writing stage, series composition writer Deko Akao split up the story. In the storyboard phase, which serves as the "blueprint" for the finished video, Itamura wanted to represent as many of the poses from the manga as possible. The purpose was to be as faithful as possible to the original manga. Nevertheless, the team often took liberties like in the first episode by portraying a fight scene using silhouettes. The director was careful to make the storyboards look appealing when making the fight scenes. When Vanitas uses his book, 3D animation was used by color artist Izumi Takizawa with vivid colors to be faithful to the source material.

Itamura said it was difficult to make a general distinction, but he thinks that "shojo manga-like" elements occupy a large part of the series. He aimed to make scenarios and characters to be stylistic beauty, as he feels that beautifulness is necessary. In order to animate it properly, research was done by the staff during a visit to Paris, where the series is set. He wanted to keep the darkness of a traditional vampire movie in the anime with a horror feeling. In this era, people can see anything if they increase the sensitivity. Due to their contrasting personalities, Vanitas and Noé are kept away from each other and rarely are seen in the same frame. The director tried to be careful because there are places where the charm is lost if it is a familiar relationship.

The protagonists Vanitas and Noé are voiced by Natsuki Hanae and Kaito Ishikawa, respectively, and their performances were the subject of positive response. The director notes that both Hanae's Ishikawa's plays complement each others' character nature. Hanae makes full use of all the cool, uncool, and sexy parts to bring out the charm of Vanitas whereas Ishikawa is good at playing the reaction of natural's boke's. Hanae was cast as Vanitas for his vast experience as an actor and also because of the sex appeal he can bring even when reading simple lines like "It's a secret". Inori Minase, who plays Jeanne, said her character is quite rare for her, or that she has played a lot of protected characters, but not the defender role The scenes where Noé takes Dominique's blood and Jeanne takes Vanitas' blood were done to emphasize a sex appeal even though the characters are clothed. The music was played in these scenes to convey an erotic feel.

Themes
The series deals with the themes of existence and identity. The author found identity to be more crucial in Vanitas than in Pandora Hearts and in her other work Crimson-Shell, which also uses these elements. The author wished to show little by little what is hidden deep in the hearts of her characters. When they explored more in this direction, she inevitably arrived at the question of identity and the meaning of existence. From the start, for the author, Vanitas had to be a character inspiring a feeling of freedom and eccentricity. He also does about anything that intrigues him. In addition, it allowed her to strike a balance with Noé, the other main character, who is pure, kind, and has a strong sense of justice and responsibility. Finally, both are complementary. Possessing a grimoire capable of saving cursed vampires, Jun Mochizuki has claimed Vanitas' duties are the main aspect of the manga as the manga author wants to portray the themes of identities which a person can lose and recover.

Then in terms of the idea of the real name of vampires, she thinks in video games and anime and fantasy manga in Japan sin is a concept that is used quite often, so it's not is not a "novelty" created by her. However, she chose to introduce it for specific reasons. Initially, the concept of Vanitas as a vampire savior was already established, but then she had to think about how to visually show him healing the vampires in the story. Making him perform pure medical procedures did not interest her, and she does not think her readers would have liked it very much. So she thought about something more conceptual, and that's where the idea of using this real name story came to her. Vanitas also wears an earring that looks like an hourglass. Upon first seeing it, writer Deko Akao believed that such item appears to have a history, something which proved him right upon further seeing Vanitas' past in the manga. Anime News Network stated that such earrings reflected his mortality and short lifespan which also comes across as the message the author aims to give.

Media

Manga

The Case Study of Vanitas is written and illustrated by Jun Mochizuki. The series began in Square Enix's Monthly Gangan Joker on December 22, 2015. In April 2020, Mochizuki announced that the manga would be on hiatus due to the COVID-19 pandemic. The manga resumed publication in November 2020. Square Enix has collected its chapters into individual tankōbon volumes. The first volume was released on April 22, 2016. As of May 20, 2022, ten volumes have been released.

On December 3, 2015, Yen Press announced on its official Twitter account that it would be publishing new chapters of the series concurrently with Japan. The manga is also licensed in Taiwan by Sharp Point Press, in Hong Kong by Sparkle Roll, in South Korea by Daewon C.I., in France by Ki-oon, in Germany by Carlsen Manga, in Italy by Star Comics, in Spain by Norma Editorial, in Russia by Istari Comics, in Thailand by Siam Inter Comics, in Vietnam by Kim Đồng Publishing House and in Poland by Waneko.

Anime

On March 28, 2021, it was announced at AnimeJapan that the series would be receiving an anime television series adaptation by Bones. It was directed by Tomoyuki Itamura, with scripts overseen by Deko Akao and character designs by Yoshiyuki Ito. Yuki Kajiura composed the series' music. The series is a split-cour anime, with the first half airing from July 3 to September 18, 2021, on Tokyo MX and other channels. The second half aired from January 15 to April 2, 2022. The first opening theme is "Sora to Utsuro" by Sasanomaly, while the first ending theme is "0 (zero)" by LMYK. The second opening theme is "Your Name" by Little Glee Monster, while the second ending theme is "salvation" by MONONKUL. Funimation licensed the series outside of Asia. On August 5, 2021, Funimation announced the series would receive an English dub, which premiered the following day. Plus Media Networks Asia has licensed the series in Southeast Asia and released it on Aniplus Asia and IQIYI.

Reception

Manga

As of June 2021, The Case Study of Vanitas had over 5.5 million copies in circulation. Upon its release, the Japanese volumes appeared in charts from Oricon. Critics enjoyed the handling of Vanitas and setting and praised the mix of action, humor and adventure, while at the same time praising his relationship with Noe. The Fandom Post acclaimed the first manga volume as it exceeded his expectations. Melina Dargis from Fandom Post also wanted the manga to be adapted into an anime in 2017. The focus on romance between arcs was praised for its handling of Vanitas as hilarious character considering how poorly he reacts to his feelings towards Jeanne. Manga News praised the handling of Vanitas through his tragic backstory, and noted that Mochizuki's handling of narrations is hard to follow. In a following review, The Fandom Post enjoyed the mix of action and multiple events occurring in the manga's seventh volume and that while the art was not that detailed, the action scenes made up for it. El Palomitrón said while there is no boys' love between the two leads due to the focus on other, more explored relationships, the reviewer found the connection between Vanitas and Noé deep and comparable to the one between Vanitas and Jeanne.

The art was praised by Otaku USA for its handling of a steampunk setting as well as the characterization of the title character. Manga News enjoyed the multiple character designs, spanning from bishonen types to built bodies who interact together. Although the manga is published in a shōnen magazine, the art was compared with "beautiful shojo-esque art style" by Comic Book Resources, making it equal to Pandora Hearts. Fandom Post claimed the art was "stunning", praising the details of every page, including the fight sequences. Anime News Network felt that the artwork was inspired by folklore and found the artwork appealing, due to the multiple designs and setting but sometimes it was hard to follow.

Anime
The series was listed twice by Anime News Network as one of the best anime from 2021, while IGN featured it in their own list as well. The handling of vampirism between Jeanne and Vanitas as well as Dominique and Noé was listed by Caitlin Moore from Anime News Network as the best moment in anime from such year due to amount of sex appeal they portray directly. The Fandom Post agreed in regards to the sex appeal featured during the episode where Jeanne sucks Vanitas' blood, comparing it directly to sex, hinting it as an example to why their misrelationship could progress in following episodes of the series.

The Fandom Post found the early fight scenes of the series were the most appealing parts of the series based on how unpredictable Vanitas was, especially when dealing with Jeanne, but the series was less eventful in other areas where there was criticism over the handling of science fiction elements. Several reviewers focused on Vanitas' relationship with the vampire Jeanne. Vanitas forcing a kiss with her was criticized as being inappropriate as comedy. The massive violence displayed in the series' fifth episode resulted in Funimation warning sensitive viewers to avoid watching it. Bones' animation has been generally praised for making the settings and character details appealing alongside Yuki Kajiura's music. Natsuki Hanae's performance as Vanitas brought major praise from Anime Feminist for how he conveyed different sides of Vanitas' twisted personality to the point he comes across as "peak trash". The Fandom Post noted that Vanitas and Jeanne's comical date is more enjoyable than the main plot which is later foreshadowed. The series' second half also earned a positive reception from Anime News Network writers due to the character arcs of the main cast as well as the production value, to the point that they considered it to be one of the best anime of the Winter 2022 season.

In 2022, the series was nominated for the 6th Crunchyroll Anime Awards in the category of "Best Fantasy". The characters of Vanitas, Noé, and Jeanne were popular in Anitrendz, with Vanitas and Jeanne being nominated in the couple category in 2022. The series was also nominated for the 7th Crunchyroll Anime Awards in the "Best Fantasy" category in 2023.

See also
List of Square Enix manga franchises

Notes

References

External links
  
  
 

2015 manga
Anime composed by Yuki Kajiura
Aniplex
Bones (studio)
Comics set in Paris
Crunchyroll anime
Dark fantasy anime and manga
Fiction about alchemy
Gangan Comics manga
Shōnen manga
Steampunk anime and manga
Supernatural anime and manga
Television shows set in Paris
Tokyo MX original programming
Vampires in anime and manga
Yen Press titles